The Royal Scots College (Real Colegio de Escoceses) is a major seminary in Salamanca, Spain, for the Catholic Church in Scotland. It was located originally at Madrid, then Valladolid, and then Salamanca (from 1988).

History

The Royal Scots College was founded at Madrid in 1627 by Colonel William Semple of Lochwinnoch and his wife, Doña María de Ledesma.  Semple had spent his life in the military and diplomatic service of the Spanish crown.

The deed of foundation stipulated that the college was for students "Scottish by birth, preferably those of superior character and virtue and those who promise more fruit in the welfare of souls, and they have to spend whatever time may be necessary in studying Grammar and Philosophy, Theology, Controversies and Sacred Scripture, so that when they are well versed in all of these, they may proceed to the said Kingdom of Scotland to preach the Gospel and convert heretics... when they leave the said seminary for this purpose, others are to be received in their place having the same end, and thus the matter will continue for as long as the aforesaid conversion may require."

The Scottish Jesuit Hugh Semple was procurator or acting rector of the Scots College when it was located in Madrid, until his death in 1654. For much of its subsequent history in Madrid, the College was run by Spanish Jesuits. In 1771, it was transferred to Valladolid under the direction of Scottish secular clergy.  The college was closed from 1808 to 1816 due to the Peninsular War.

The College was transferred to Salamanca in 1988 in order for students to attend the Pontifical University of Salamanca.

In September 2020, a 1634 edition of The Two Noble Kinsmen, the last play by English playwright William Shakespeare, was reported to have been discovered at the Royal Scots College's library in Salamanca, Spain, which it is believed to be the oldest copy of any of his works in the country.

Rectors
 
 Rev. John Geddes (1771-1780)
 Rev. Alexander Cameron (1780-1798)
 Rev. John Gordon (1798-1810)
 Rev. Alexander Cameron (1810-1833)
 Rev. John Cameron (1833-1873)
 Rev. John Cowie (1873–1879)
 Rev. David McDonald (1879–1903)
 Rev. John Woods (1903–1909)
 Rt. Rev. Mgr. James Humble (1909–1940)
 Rev. Dr James Connolly (1940-1952)
 Rt. Rev. Mgr. Philip Flanagan (1952-1960)
 Rev. Daniel Patrick Boyle (1960-1965)
 Rev. Maurice Taylor (1965-1974)
 Very Rev. John Canon Walls (1974-1981)
 Rev. John McGee (1981-1987)
 Rev. Ian Murray (1987-1994)
 Rev. William Dunnachie (1994-1997)
 Rev. Denis E. Carlin (1997-2004)
 Rt. Rev. Mgr. Joseph Toal (2005-2008)
 Rev. Charles O'Farrell (2009-2014)
 Rev. Thomas A. Kilbride (2014–present)

Notable alumni 

 Angus Chisholm (1759/60-1818), Vicar Apostolic of the Highland District
Angus Bernard MacEachern (1759-1835), first Bishop of the Diocese of Charlottetown, Prince Edward Island
 Alexander Macdonnell (1762-1840), Bishop of Kingston
 William Fraser (1779-1851), Bishop of Arichat
 John Murdoch (1796-1865), Vicar Apostolic of the Western District
 George Rigg (1814-1887), Bishop of Dunkeld
 James McCarthy (1853-1943), Bishop of Galloway
 John Toner (1857-1949), Bishop of Dunkeld
 Allan MacDonald (1859-1905), priest, folklorist, and poet in the Scottish Gaelic language. One of the most important figures in 19th century Scottish Gaelic literature.
 Donald Martin (1873-1938), Bishop of Argyll and the Isles
 William Hart (1904-1992), Bishop of Dunkeld
 James Monaghan (1914-1994), Auxiliary Bishop of St Andrews and Edinburgh
 Ian Murray (1932-2016), Bishop of Argyll and the Isles
 Joseph Toal (born 1956), Bishop of Motherwell

See also
Scots College (Rome)
Scots College (Paris)

References

External links
 http://www.scots-college-salamanca.org/
Seminaries associated with the Roman Catholic Bishops' Conference of Scotland

Universities and colleges in Spain
Educational institutions established in the 1620s
1627 establishments in Spain
Catholic Church in Scotland
Catholic seminaries